Jorge Arturo Oropeza Torres (born 4 May 1983 in Mexico City) is a Mexican former professional footballer.

References

External links

1983 births
Living people
Footballers from Mexico City
Association football midfielders
Deportivo Toluca F.C. players
Mexican expatriate footballers
Mexican footballers
Expatriate footballers in Albania
Flamurtari Vlorë players
Mexican expatriate sportspeople in Albania
Expatriate footballers in Romania
FCM Bacău players
Mexican expatriate sportspeople in Romania
Expatriate footballers in Guatemala
Atlético Mexiquense footballers